El manantial del milagro, is a Mexican telenovela directed by Julio Castillo and produced by Ernesto Alonso for Televisa in 1974. Starring by Julissa and Enrique Álvarez Félix.

Synopsis 
The story of this telenovela revolves around a mysterious fountain, said to have healing powers.

Cast

References

External links 

Mexican telenovelas
1974 telenovelas
Televisa telenovelas
Spanish-language telenovelas
1974 Mexican television series debuts
1974 Mexican television series endings